Josette Shaje a Tshiluila (born 1949) is an anthropologist and museum executive in the Democratic Republic of the Congo.

Life
Tshiluila was born on 5 March 1949 in Likasi, Zaire (now the Democratic Republic of the Congo). She was educated at Albert I College, Kinshasa, and at Lovanium University and the University of Lubumbashi. In 1974 she married Babi-Banga N'Sampuka.

In 1973 Tshiluila joined the Institut des Musées nationaux du Zaïre. She was Head of the Traditional Art Section from 1983 to 1986, and appointed Deputy Director-General in 1987. In 1986 she became the Director of the Kinshasa Museum. In 1990 she was made a Professor at the University of Kinshasa.

Works
 
 'Cultural Heritage in Zaire : towards Museums for Development'. 1995. 
 'Le trafic illicite', in Caroline Gaultier-Kurhan, ed., Patrimoine culturel africain, 2001, pp. 299–319
 'An African view of ethnographic collections in Europe and Africa'. 2002
 'The sacred forests of the Bakongos', in Nature and culture in the Democratic Republic of Congo, pp. 112–117

References

1949 births
Living people
Democratic Republic of the Congo academics
Democratic Republic of the Congo Africanists
Museum directors
Lovanium University alumni
Academic staff of the University of Kinshasa